Frederick Mills (1910 – 5 December 1944) was an English footballer who played at right-half for Port Vale and Leeds United throughout the 1930s. He was killed during World War II.

Early and personal life
Frederick Mills born on 18 August 1911; he was the son of Frederick and Ann Mills of Hanley, Stoke-on-Trent. He worked at a local pottery firm.

Career
Mills joined Port Vale from Middleport, initially as an amateur, in April 1932. He signed professional forms the next month and scored his first goal in professional football on 10 December 1932, in a 3–1 win over Bradford Park Avenue at The Old Recreation Ground. He finished the 1932–33 season with three goals in 37 appearances. He scored twice in 37 Second Division games in the 1933–34 campaign. He was sold to Leeds United in June 1934, as the club were running short of money.

He made his debut for Leeds at centre-forward, before switching to inside-right. After 16 games of the 1934–35 season he broke his leg, causing him to miss the entire 1935–36 campaign. He played 32 times at wing-half in the 1936–37 season, and scored twice in 12 First Division appearances in 1937–38. He played eight games in 1938–39, but left Elland Road after the outbreak of World War II.

Military service
Mills joined the 6th Battalion King's Shropshire Light Infantry, a new unit formed in 1940, which was converted into 181st Field Regiment, Royal Artillery in 1942. Gunner Mills was known to his comrades as 'Paddy' and was strong member of the regimental football team. On 5 December 1944, after the fighting for Blerick in the Netherlands, the regiment was in convoy and halted in a taped route through a minefield. "The story goes that Paddy had found most of a German Machine Gun and was keen to complete his trophy … Suddenly Paddy was heard to shout 'That's just what I'm looking for' or words to that effect. He jumped out of the lorry, and into the minefield. It's not clear whether he stepped on a mine, or the box he picked up was booby-trapped, but Paddy was killed instantly." Recordedly aged 36, he left a widow, Lucy, and is buried in Venray War Cemetery.

Career statistics
Source:

See also
List of footballers killed during World War II

References

Bibliography

Don Neal, Guns and Bugles: The Story of the 6th Bn KSLI – 181st Field Regiment RA 1940–1946, Studley: Brewin, 2001, .

Burials in Limburg (Netherlands)
Sportspeople from Hanley, Staffordshire
English footballers
Association football midfielders
Port Vale F.C. players
Leeds United F.C. players
English Football League players
1911 births
1944 deaths
Military personnel from Staffordshire
British Army personnel killed in World War II
King's Shropshire Light Infantry soldiers
Royal Artillery soldiers